Leszek Leon Birkholc (16 April 1904 – 26 April 1968) was a Polish rower who competed in the 1928 Summer Olympics.

In 1928 he won the bronze medal as member of the Polish boat in the coxed four event.

He was born in Crone an der Brahe, Kreis Bromberg and died in Kłodzko.

References

External links
 profile 

1904 births
1968 deaths
Polish male rowers
Olympic rowers of Poland
Rowers at the 1928 Summer Olympics
Olympic bronze medalists for Poland
Olympic medalists in rowing
People from Bydgoszcz County
Sportspeople from Kuyavian-Pomeranian Voivodeship
Medalists at the 1928 Summer Olympics
European Rowing Championships medalists
Road incident deaths in Poland